Scandal'us (or Scandal'Us) were the winners of the Australian Popstars 2 in 2001 (successors of Bardot, the winners of the first Australian Popstars in 2000). They won an ARIA chart award for their No. 1 debut single "Me, Myself & I". Their second and final single, "Make Me Crazy", only reached No. 30. Their debut album, Startin' Somethin', debuted and peaked at No. 2 on the ARIA Albums Chart. The group disbanded in 2002.

Members
Anna Belperio (from Adelaide)
Jason Bird (from Melbourne)
Simon Ditcham (from Hobart)
Tamara Jaber (from Sydney)
Daniela Scala (from Adelaide)

Solo releases
Tamara Jaber released two solo singles, "Ooh Ahh" and "Hard for Me" under the mononym Tamara. Both reached the ARIA Top 30. Tamara was the only person signed to her radio personality ex-husband Kyle Sandilands's label King Kyle Records. He was criticised for promoting his girlfriend's single on his popular radio show. A solo album was meant for release but never eventuated. In 2008, Tamara sought a record deal in Los Angeles.

Around 2003, Jason Bird recorded a single to be distributed through his dance workshop website.  He performed the track on Channel Nine's Mornings with Kerri-Anne show.

Discography

Albums

Singles

Awards and nominations

ARIA Music Awards
The ARIA Music Awards is an annual awards ceremony that recognises excellence, innovation, and achievement across all genres of Australian music. They commenced in 1987. 

! 
|-
|rowspan="2" | 2001
| "My, Myself and I"
| Highest Selling Single
| 
| 
|-
| Kelley Abbey for "My, Myself and I"
| Best Video
| 
|  
|-

References

ARIA Award winners
Popstars winners
Australian pop music groups
Musical groups disestablished in 2002
Musical groups established in 2001